The 1886 Altrincham by-election was held on 26 March 1886 after the incumbent Conservative MP, John Baguley Brooks died.  The seat was retained won by the Conservative candidate, Sir William Cunliffe Brooks.

References

By-elections to the Parliament of the United Kingdom in Cheshire constituencies
March 1886 events
1886 elections in the United Kingdom
1886 in England
19th century in Cheshire
Altrincham